T. B. Vittal Rao was an Indian politician. He was elected to the Lok Sabha, the lower house of the Parliament of India from Khammam as a member of the Communist Party of India.

References

External links
 Official biographical sketch on the Parliament of India website

Communist Party of India politicians from Telangana
Lok Sabha members from Andhra Pradesh
India MPs 1952–1957
India MPs 1957–1962
1915 births
Year of death missing